The Gulf Islands are islands in the Strait of Georgia in British Columbia, Canada.

Gulf Islands may also refer to:
 Gulf Islands National Park Reserve, national park located on and around the Gulf Islands in British Columbia 
 Gulf Islands National Seashore,  protected regions along the Gulf of Mexico barrier islands of Florida and Mississippi
 Gulf Islands Film and Television School, a film school located on Galiano Island off the west coast of British Columbia, Canada 
 Saanich—Gulf Islands, federal electoral district in British Columbia, Canada
 Persian Gulf islands